Southside or South Side may refer to:

Places

Australia

 Southside, Queensland, a semi-rural locality in the Gympie Region

Canada
 South Side, Newfoundland and Labrador, a community in the St. George's Bay area on the southwest coast of Newfoundland

United Kingdom
 Southside, Birmingham, an area in Birmingham, England
 South Side, County Durham, a village in County Durham, England
 Southside, Edinburgh, a community in the city of Edinburgh, Scotland
 South Side, Glasgow, a district south of the River Clyde in Glasgow, Scotland
 Southside Wandsworth, a shopping centre in Wandsworth, South London, England

Ireland
 Southside, Dublin, an area in Dublin, Ireland

United States
 Southside, Alabama
 Southside, Birmingham, Alabama
 Southside, Berkeley, California
 South Side, Chicago, a section of Chicago, Illinois
 Southside (East Chicago), a neighborhood of East Chicago, Indiana
 Southside Township, Minnesota, a township in Minnesota
 South Jamaica, Queens or Southside, a section of Queens, New York
 South Side (Columbus, Ohio), a neighborhood in Columbus, Ohio
 South Side (Pittsburgh), a neighborhood in Pittsburgh, Pennsylvania
 South Side, Providence, Rhode Island
 Southside (Richmond, Virginia)
 Southside, Hardin County, Tennessee
 Southside, Montgomery County, Tennessee
 Southside (Virginia)

Music 
 Southside (Lloyd album) (2004)
 Southside (Sam Hunt album) (2020)
 Southside (Texas album) (1989)
 "Southside" (Lil' Keke song), (1997)
 "South Side" (song), a 1999 song by Moby
 "Southside" (Lloyd song) (2004)
 "Southside" (Lil Baby song) (2018)
 "Southside", song by David Dallas
 Southside Festival, a German music festival
"SouthSide", a 2019 song by DJ Snake and Eptic

People with the name
 Southside (record producer) (Joshua Howard Luellen; born 1989), American record producer
 Southside Johnny (John Lyon; born 1948), American singer, harmonica player, and songwriter

Other uses
 South Side (TV series)
 South Side (cocktail)

See also
 South London, the southern part of London, England
 South Hampton Roads, the southern portion of the Hampton Roads metropolitan area of Virginia and locally called "the Southside"
 Southside High School (disambiguation)
 Southsider (disambiguation)